Megan Manthey (born July 22, 1988) is a professional American soccer midfielder who has played for the Seattle Sounders Women of the United Soccer Leagues W-League among other teams in Europe, most recently Stjarnan, Iceland.

Personal life
Megan's hometown is Ferndale, Washington. She played high school soccer at IMG Academy while attending The Pendleton School located in Bradenton, Florida.

Soccer career
Manthey played with teams internationally in France and most recently in Iceland. She played with the Seattle Sounders Women for the 2012 season. Previously, Manthey played in 61 matches for Fortuna Hjørring in Denmark. Manthey helped Fortuna Hjørring to the Danish Championship in 2009, 2010, and 2011. She played Division I soccer for University of Colorado  and College of Charleston. While with College of Charleston she was an All-Southern Conference selection. She scored 14 goals and 6 assists in 21 games for the 2008 season with the Cougars.

References

External links
 

1988 births
Living people
American women's soccer players
Seattle Sounders Women players
People from Ferndale, Washington
Soccer players from Washington (state)
USL W-League (1995–2015) players
Women's association football forwards
Colorado Buffaloes women's soccer players
College of Charleston Cougars women's soccer players
Stjarnan women's football players